German submarine U-594 was a Type VIIC U-boat built for Nazi Germany's Kriegsmarine for service during World War II.
She was laid down on 17 December 1940 by Blohm & Voss, Hamburg as yard number 570, launched on 3 September 1941 and commissioned on 30 October 1941 under Kapitänleutnant Dietrich Hoffmann.

Design
German Type VIIC submarines were preceded by the shorter Type VIIB submarines. U-594 had a displacement of  when at the surface and  while submerged. She had two shafts and two  propellers.

U-594 was fitted with five  torpedo tubes (four fitted at the bow and one at the stern), fourteen torpedoes, one  SK C/35 naval gun, 220 rounds, and a  C/30 anti-aircraft gun. The boat had a complement of between forty-four and sixty.

Service history
The boat's career began with training at 8th U-boat Flotilla on 30 October 1941, followed by active service on 1 March 1942 as part of the 7th U-boat Flotilla for the remainder of her service.

Convoy ON 127
The convoy ON 127, westbound from the UK to New York, assembled in the North Channel during 5 September 1942. The convoy comprised 32 ships, many of them oil tankers in ballast. The ocean escort, C4, was largely Canadian.

Soon after sunset the convoy set off in eight columns of four. 600 miles out into the Atlantic Wolf Pack Vorwärts waited in ambush. Of the 13 U-boats, very few of their commanders had combat experience or success to their name; Friedrich Mumm in U-594 was a complete novice.

Initial contact came on the evening of 9 September 1942, and by this time Vorwärts had been reinforced with additional boats from Stier. The weather was fine with good visibility but the convoy escorts had been forewarned by the Admiralty about the presence of the enemy.

On 12 September, both  and U-594 launched torpedoes unsuccessfully that night. U-594 eventually sank the straggling  American-owned Panamanian-flagged steamer Stone Street with a single torpedo which struck the engine room on the port side.

When U-594 surfaced she accidentally capsized the Stone Street’s lifeboat, but the men were taken aboard, questioned and provided with supplies of whiskey and food, then released; except for the master who was retained as a POW.

Fate
U-594 was sunk on 5 June 1943 in the North Atlantic in position , by depth charges from a RAF Hudson bomber. All hands were lost.

Wolfpacks
U-594 took part in six wolfpacks, namely:
 Blücher (14 – 28 August 1942)
 Stier (29 August – 2 September 1942)
 Vorwärts (2 – 17 September 1942)
 Jaguar (10 – 31 January 1943)
 Pfeil (1 – 9 February 1943)
 Löwenherz (1 – 10 April 1943)

Summary of raiding history

References

Bibliography

External links

German Type VIIC submarines
1941 ships
U-boats commissioned in 1941
Ships lost with all hands
U-boats sunk in 1943
U-boats sunk by depth charges
U-boats sunk by British aircraft
World War II shipwrecks in the Atlantic Ocean
World War II submarines of Germany
Ships built in Hamburg
Maritime incidents in June 1943